Upconversion, upconverter, or upconverting may refer to:

 Scaling of a video signal to higher resolution 
 Up- and down-conversion of analog signals (heterodyning)
 Photon upconversion
 Block upconverter